Zephyr is a small real-time operating system (RTOS) for connected, resource-constrained and embedded devices (with an emphasis on microcontrollers) supporting multiple architectures and released under the Apache License 2.0. Zephyr includes a kernel, and all components and libraries, device drivers, protocol stacks, file systems, and firmware updates, needed to develop full application software.

History
Zephyr originated from Virtuoso RTOS for digital signal processors (DSPs). In 2001, Wind River Systems acquired Belgian software company Eonic Systems, the developer of Virtuoso. In November 2015, Wind River Systems renamed the operating system to Rocket, made it open-source and royalty-free. Compared to Wind River's other RTOS, VxWorks, Rocket had a much smaller memory needs, especially suitable for sensors and single-function embedded devices. Rocket could fit into as little as 4 KB of memory, while VxWorks needed 200 KB or more.

In February 2016, Rocket became a hosted collaborative project of the Linux Foundation under the name Zephyr. Wind River Systems contributed the Rocket kernel to Zephyr, but still provided Rocket to its clients, charging them for the cloud services. As a result, Rocket became "essentially the commercial version of Zephyr".

Since then, early members and supporters of Zephyr include Intel, NXP Semiconductors, Synopsys, Linaro, Texas Instruments, DeviceTone, Nordic Semiconductor, Oticon, and Bose.

, Zephyr had the largest number of contributors and commits compared to other RTOSes (including Mbed, RT-Thread, NuttX, and RIOT).

Features
Zephyr intends to provide all components needed to develop resource-constrained and embedded or microcontroller-based applications. This includes, but is not limited to:
 A small kernel
 A flexible configuration and build system for compile-time definition of required resources and modules
 A set of protocol stacks (IPv4 and IPv6, Constrained Application Protocol (CoAP), LwM2M, MQTT, 802.15.4, Thread, Bluetooth Low Energy, CAN)
 A virtual file system interface with several flash file systems for non-volatile storage (FatFs, LittleFS, NVS)
 Management and device firmware update mechanisms

Configuration and build system
Zephyr uses Kconfig and devicetree as its configuration systems, inherited from the Linux kernel but implemented in the programming language Python for portability to non-Unix operating systems. The RTOS build system is based on CMake, which allows Zephyr applications to be built on Linux, macOS, and Microsoft Windows.

Kernel
Early Zephyr kernels used a dual nanokernel plus microkernel design. In December 2016, with Zephyr 1.6, this changed to a monolithic kernel.

The kernel offers several features that distinguish it from other small OSes:
 Single address space
 Multiple scheduling algorithms
 Highly configurable and modular for flexibility, with resources defined at compile-time
 Memory protection unit (MPU) based protection
 Asymmetric multiprocessing (AMP, based on OpenAMP) and symmetric multiprocessing (SMP) support

Security
A group is dedicated to maintaining and improving the security. Also, being owned and supported by a community means the world's open source developers are vetting the code, which significantly increases security.

See also
 Embedded operating system

References

ARM operating systems
Embedded operating systems
Free software operating systems
Linux Foundation projects
Real-time operating systems
Software using the Apache license